The 1976 United States Senate election in Montana took place on November 2, 1976. Rather than seek a fifth term, incumbent United States Senator Mike Mansfield, a Democrat, opted to retire, creating an open seat. United States Congressman John Melcher, who had represented Montana's 2nd congressional district from 1969 to 1977, won the Democratic nomination and defeated Stanley C. Burger, the Republican nominee, by a wide margin in the general election.

Democratic primary

Candidates
John Melcher, United States Congressman from Montana's 2nd congressional district
Ray Gulick, farmer

Results

Republican primary

Candidates
Stanley C. Burger, former Executive Officer of the Montana Farm Bureau Federation
Dave Drum
Jack Tierney
Larry L. Gilbert

Results

General election

Results

See also 
 1976 United States Senate elections

References

Montana
1976
1976 Montana elections
1976 in Montana